Rock, Paper, Scissors is a 2012 Venezuelan horror drama film directed by Hernán Jabes. The film was selected as the Venezuelan entry for the Best Foreign Language Oscar at the 85th Academy Awards, but it did not make the final shortlist. The Bollywood remake named; Visfot was under production as of September 2021, starring Ritesh Deshmukh and Fardeen Khan.

Cast
 Gloria Montoya as Mariana

See also
 List of submissions to the 85th Academy Awards for Best Foreign Language Film
 List of Venezuelan submissions for the Academy Award for Best Foreign Language Film

References

External links
 

2012 films
2012 drama films
American teen horror films
Films set in boarding schools
2010s Spanish-language films
Venezuelan drama films
2010s American films
Hyperlink films